True Memoirs of an International Assassin is a 2016 American action comedy film directed by Jeff Wadlow from a screenplay co-written with Jeff Morris. The film stars Kevin James, Zulay Henao, Andy García, Maurice Compte, Kelen Coleman, Andrew Howard, and Rob Riggle. The film was released on November 11, 2016.

Plot

Sam Larson (Kevin James) is a loner who has written a fictional novel, Memoirs of an International Assassin,  but is having trouble with the ending, the signature line  at the end. After discussing his problem with his good friend Amos (Ron Rifkin) and receiving an outlandish story about an assassin named Ghost, Larson decides to incorporate what Amos tells him into his novel. The novel is published online and is classified as nonfiction, retitled True Memoirs of an International Assassin.

Now a bestseller, Larson is kidnapped and taken to Venezuela.  Larson is awakened by El Toro (Andy García), a revolutionary who wants the assassination of the President of Venezuela, Miguel Cueto (Kim Coates), who believes the novel to be the truth and tasks Larson with the assassination.

Larson escapes the revolutionaries and goes to the nearest police station, where he asks to be taken to the US embassy, but discovers they are the gangster Anton Masovich's (Andrew Howard) henchmen, and they demand money. Larson then calls Applebaum, but believing that he is just playing with her, she hangs up. Before the police can kill him, Larson is saved by DEA agent, Rosa Bolivar (Zulay Henao).

After they escape, Bolivar asks Larson to talk with Masovich to clear up the situation. There, Masovich asks Larson to kill El Toro, as he would be affected should the president be killed. Larson pretends to agree after seeing Masovich's violent behavior. Meanwhile, CIA agents William Cobb (Rob Riggle) and Michael Cleveland (Leonard Earl Howze) meet with the president and General Ruiz (Yul Vazquez) regarding Larson, and they agree to meet with him.

Larson and Bolivar, while talking about the situation at a restaurant, are found by Juan, who takes Larson hostage. Juan and Larson then talk about the situation regarding the President. Larson tries to get Juan to steal a truck, but in the process, he gets captured by General Ruiz. General Ruiz then tells Larson to kill Masovich (as he has too much power) or Larson will be tried and executed for his involvement with killing the president, prompting Larson to agree. Cobb and Cleveland, who noticed this, decide to get him killed by filling in Masovich, who goes into a violent rage upon hearing that Larson betrayed him.

Larson meets Bolivar and fills her in, who then admits she has always wanted to kill Masovich, as he caused the DEA to write her off. She comes up with a plan to humiliate both Masovich and the president. Larson initially refuses, stating he just wants to go home. They are then promptly attacked by Masovich's minions, and escape, but not before he gets shot in the shoulder.

Larson and Bolivar then return to El Toro's, getting an army to infiltrate the inauguration ball and murder the president. When they arrive, Ruiz reminds Larson to kill Masovich., Masovich then spots Larson and attempts to kill him, but Bolivar distracts him. Juan, disguised as a waiter, reminds him of El Toro's orders. After they dance, Bolivar and Masovich fight upstairs, while Larson forces the president to confess his plan to kill Masovich. The president finds out Larson has recorded him but, being depressed and hating his life, promptly kills himself. Meanwhile, the fight between Bolivar and Masovich reaches the president's office and ends with Masovich getting shot and killed by Ruiz.

Larson and Bolivar then get arrested by General Ruiz, but are sent back to El Toro's, and Juan apologizes to Larson for not believing him. Bolivar is hired for the revolution by El Toro, and El Toro takes Larson alone, preparing to kill him (as he knows too much). Cobb and Cleveland interrupt him, as they are asked to take him home. Larson is happy to go, but worried about Bolivar. At the airport, Larson escapes to try to save Bolivar, who is being held by El Toro for information. Just as Juan is about to kill her, Larson appears, armed.

Larson convinces Juan to take his side, they fight El Toro and attempt to free Bolivar. However, they are defeated, and El Toro takes Bolivar in his helicopter. Juan convinces Larson not to give up, and so he follows them onto it. After a brief struggle, Larson finally kills El Toro, who remarks that he always knew Larson was the Ghost. Larson and Bolivar then jump out of the helicopter and land in the water. Then, cornered by General Ruiz (who plans to take over the country), they are about to be killed by him, but then he's shot by Amos (the real Ghost), who disappears.

Six months later, Juan is the president of Venezuela, with Bolivar watching. Cobb and Cleveland, who are also watching, remark that he will be hard to control and that they hate the Ghost. Larson has become a bestselling author, having released his new book, which includes some of his Venezuela adventures. At a TV interview with Katie Couric, she asks him whether the book was real, and Larson denies it, saying it is a work of fiction.

Cast
 Kevin James as Sam Larson (pretending to be the assassin known as "The Ghost").
 Zulay Henao as DEA Agent Rosa Bolivar
 Andy García as El Toro
 Maurice Compte as Juan
 Kelen Coleman as Kylie Applebaum
 Andrew Howard as Anton Masovich
 Ron Rifkin as Amos AKA The Ghost
 Rob Riggle as William Cobb
 Leonard Earl Howze as Michael Cleveland
 Yul Vazquez as Gen. Ruiz
 Kim Coates as President Cueto
 P. J. Byrne as Trent
 Emilie Ullerup as Stephanie
 Lauren Shaw as Sabine
 Jeff Chase as La Roche
 Katie Couric as herself

Production
The film's script, titled The True Memoirs of an International Assassin, written by Jeff Morris, appeared on the 2009 Black List of best un-produced screenplays. The story revolves around an accountant and author, Joe, who is mistaken for an assassin when his fictional novel The Memoirs of an International Assassin is accidentally published as nonfiction under the title The True Memoirs of an International Assassin. On May 6, 2015, Kevin James was cast in the film to play the lead role. Jeff Wadlow was hired to re-write and direct the film, which Merced Media would finance, while PalmStar and Global Film Group would produce. Todd Garner and Kevin Frakes would also produce the film along with Raja Collins and Justin Begnaud, and Merced's Raj Brinder Singh. On May 19, 2015, it was announced that Netflix had bought the worldwide distribution rights to the comedy-drama film at the 68th Cannes Film Festival.

On October 20, 2015, Genesis Rodriguez signed on to play the female lead role as an undercover DEA agent. On November 12, 2015, Andy Garcia joined the film to play El Toro, a Venezuelan revolutionary leader.

On November 23, 2015, Rodriguez left the project due to injuries incurred during the film rehearsals; she stated on her Instagram that "it is with huge disappointment that I have to announce I got injured during rehearsals of True Memoirs and I can no longer continue". Following her leave, on the same day Variety reported that Zulay Henao had signed on to play the female lead as a DEA agent who blows her cover to help rescue Joe from the drug lords. On December 7, 2015, Kim Coates joined the film, and additional cast was announced in February 2016, which included Maurice Compte, Kelen Coleman, Andrew Howard, Rob Riggle, Leonard Earl Howze, and Yul Vazquez.

Filming
Principal photography on the film began on November 16, 2015, in Atlanta and then moved to the Dominican Republic, where it wrapped on February 12, 2016. The crew included cinematographer Peter Lyons Collister, production designer Toby Corbett, costume designer Lizz Wolf, and film editor Sean Albertson.

Release
The film was released on Netflix on November 11, 2016.

Critical response
On Rotten Tomatoes the film holds an approval rating of 0% based on 9 reviews, with an average rating of 3.8/10. On Metacritic, the film has a weighted average score of 37 out of 100 based on 6 critics, indicating "generally unfavorable reviews".

References

External links
True Memoirs of an International Assassin on Netflix
 

2016 films
American action comedy films
American spy comedy films
2010s spy comedy films
Films about assassinations
Films about writers
2016 action comedy films
Films about drugs
Films scored by Ludwig Göransson
Films set in Venezuela
Films shot in Atlanta
Films shot in the Dominican Republic
Films directed by Jeff Wadlow
2010s spy films
English-language Netflix original films
2016 comedy films
2010s English-language films
2010s American films